JNT may refer to:

 Jawaharlal Nehru Technological University (disambiguation), in Indian cities
 JNT Association, later JANET, computer network
 Junctionless nanowire transistor
 Windows Journal file extension
 John Nathan-Turner, former Doctor Who producer